() is a rank used by the Russian Navy and a number of former communist state. The rank is the second most senior rank in the non-commissioned officer's career group. The rank is equivalent to senior sergeant in armies and air forces. Within NATO forces, the rank is rated as OR-7 and is equivalent to chief petty officer in English speaking navies.

Russia

The rank was introduced to the Soviet Navy in 1943.

In the navy of the Russian Federation there are four ranks in the petty officer´s career group, which means:

 Rank insignia Glavny starshina

Insignia

See also
Ranks and rank insignia of the Red Army 1940–1943
Ranks and rank insignia of the Soviet Army 1943–1955, ... 1955–1991
Ranks and rank insignia of the Russian Federation´s armed forces 1994–2010
Naval ranks and insignia of the Russian Federation

References

Military ranks of Russia
Military ranks of the Soviet Union